Un novio para Yasmina  is a 2008 Spanish-Moroccan film directed by Irene Cardona starring Sanâa Alaoui and José Luis García Pérez. It is shot in Spanish, Arabic and French. The screenplay was penned by Cardona alongside Nuria Villazán. It is a Tragaluz and Tangerine Cinema Services production.

Synopsis
Lola loves weddings, but her marriage is in crisis and she suspects that Jorge, her husband, has fallen in love with Yasmina. Yasmina wants to marry Javi as soon as possible, but Javi, a local policeman, prefers to take it slowly. Alfredo doesn't believe in marriage, but he wouldn't mind marrying for friendship... or money. The film is a summer tale concerning arranged marriages, social commitment and life as a couple.

Awards
 Festival de cine español (Málaga, 2008)

References

External links

2008 films
Spanish romantic comedy films
2000s Spanish films